"Bottle Pop" is a song by American girl group the Pussycat Dolls from their second studio album, Doll Domination (2008). It was written and produced by Sean Garrett and Fernando Garibay, with additional songwriting by lead singer Nicole Scherzinger. The song features American rapper Snoop Dogg, whom they previously collaborated with in "Buttons" (2006). Musically, "Bottle Pop" is an electronica song that uses sexual innuendo and has been compared to works of Ciara, Flo Rida, Petey Pablo, Britney Spears, and Gwen Stefani. In New Zealand, it was released on February 23, 2009 with rapper Devolo who replaces Dogg for its single release, while the following month it was available for digital download in Australia and Germany.

"Bottle Pop" received ambivalent reactions from contemporary critics; some were receptive of the song's production and picked it as one of the highlights of Doll Domination whilst others criticized Snoop Dogg's appearance, labeling it as sluggish. The song reached number one on the US Hot Dance Club Songs chart and peaked at number 17 in Australia and New Zealand. The music video for "Bottle Pop" premiered on February 1, 2009 and was directed by Thomas Kloss. In the video, the Pussycat Dolls perform the song's choreography in a theater. It was included on the set list of their headlining, Doll Domination Tour (2009).

Recording and composition 
"Bottle Pop" was written and produced by Sean Garrett and Fernando Garibay, with additional production by Clubba Langg. Garrett previously worked with the Pussycat Dolls on PCD's fourth single, "Buttons" (2006), which also features Snoop Dogg. Lead singer Nicole Scherzinger also contributed to the songwriting with coming up with the song's bridge; she took inspiration from Brandon Flowers of the Killers as she "wanted to make it a little bit more rock-y". The vocals were recorded by Miles Walker with the assistance of Mike Hogue, Chris Kasych, and Brian Schunck at Chalice Recording Studios in Los Angeles, California and at The Record Plant in Hollywood, California. Dogg appears courtesy of Doggy Style Records and Geffen Records, whose vocals were recorded by Chris Jackson at the Irvine Spot in Irvine, California. The keyboards are played by Kennard Garrett and Raymond "Rayza" Oglesby who also handled the additional drum programming. All instrumentation and programming were carried out by Garrett and Garibay. The song was mixed by Tony Maserati at Cannan Road Studios in New York City. 

Musically, "Bottle Pop" is a "funky electronica" song that runs for three minutes and 30 seconds and uses sexual innuendo. Fraser McAlpine of BBC Radio 1  compared the song to Flo Rida's "Low" (2007), Ciara's "Goodies" (2004) and, Petey Pablo's "Freek-A-Leek" (2003), but "with added PCD leathery orange sass over the top of it all".  Moreover, another reviewer from Digital Spy compared the sound to material from Britney Spears' album Blackout (2007). Scherzinger adopts "breathy vocals", which were compared to Gwen Stefani by Yahoo Music's Jamie Gill.

Reception

Critical 
Nick Bond of MTV Australia described "Bottle Pop" as "pneumatic" whilst regarding it as one of the musical highlights of Doll Domination. New York Daily News critic Jim Farber wrote the song has "a moronic hook [listeners] can't resist." Writing for Billboard, Mariel Concepcion opined that "Bottle Pop" induces the listeners with "visceral thrills." Spence D. of IGN described the song as "insidious" adding "it's straight Mac 'n Cheese, ultimately not the most healthy choice, but kind of tasty nonetheless." 
Vancouver Province's Stuart Derdeyn wrote that "Bottle Pop" "boasts a Snoop Dogg rap that he could've come up with in his sleep;" nonetheless he highlighted the song as one of the best tracks of the album for Garret's "sharp" production. Nic Oliver of musicOMH agreed with Derdeyn equating Snoop Dogg's contribution to someone who is sleepwalking adding that the lyrics were written by a "sophomore student on a weekend bender." Rudy Klapper from Sputnikmusic deemed Snoop Dogg's guest spot as "one of the weaker ones of his career" adding "the track’s lackluster chorus deflate any energy he might have afforded them." Simirlarly, a reviewer from Entertainment.ie commented that Snoop Dogg lowers himself "to new levels of cheese" with his contribution. Stephen Thomas Erlewine of Allmusic also criticized the rapper's appearance labelling it as "phoned-in". Rashod Ollison of The Baltimore Sun used the same phrase as Erlewine when describing Dogg's appearance adding he "[does] nothing to elevate the calculated [track]".

Chart performance 
"Bottle Pop" debuted at number 88 on the Canadian Hot 100 chart of October 11, 2008, and remained for one week, on the release of its parent album Doll Domination. The following year, the song debuted at number 53 on Billboard'''s US Dance Club Songs chart for the week ending March 14, 2009. After nine weeks of ascending the chart, the track went on to top the chart for the week ending May 16, 2009 after its position at number two the previous week. This gave the Pussycat Dolls their fifth consecutive number one in as many tries; it also became Snoop Dogg's fourth consecutive chat-topper. In Oceania, "Bottle Pop" debuted at number 81 on the ARIA Singles Chart, and went on to peak at number 17, four weeks later. In New Zealand, the version featuring Devolo entered at number 19, denying Snoop Dogg's 19th chart appearance and giving the Dolls their ninth charting single in the territory. In the following week it peaked at number 17.

 Release and promotion 
"Bottle Pop" was released as a single in select territories; in New Zealand, per Interscope Records request for a local rapper, the song was remixed with vocals from rapper Devolo, replacing those of Snoop Dogg and was available for digital download on February 23, 2009. On March 6, 2009, a two-track version was available for digital download in Australia on, while in Germany an extended play (EP) consisting of remixes of "Bottle Pop".

Austrian filmmaker Thomas Kloss directed the music video for "Bottle Pop" in early January. Speaking to MTV News, Scherzinger elaborated that the video focuses on dance. "It's gonna be so much fun. It's gonna be a dance video. Obviously, you can tell by our wardrobe, it's going to be very colorful and fun ... freaky fun! You guys are going to be wanting to pop some bottles after this one." The music video premiered on February 1, 2009, and uses an alternative version of the song that doesn't feature Snoop Dogg. It features the Dolls breaking into a theater and perform the song's choreography onstage. Towards the end, male dancers appear also and together perform the ending routine. Jocelyn Vena of MTV described the group's styling as a "lethal combination of barely there costumes, big hair and lots of makeup."

The Pussycat Dolls first performed "Bottle Pop" during Dick Clark's New Year's Rockin' Eve with Ryan Seacrest '09 that was broadcast live by ABC on December 31, 2008. The song was included on the set list for the Dolls' headlining Doll Domination Tour (2009).

 Track listings 

CD single / digital download (2-track)
"Bottle Pop" (Album Version) — 3:32
"Bottle Pop" (Moto Blanco Club Mix) — 6:53

Digital download (Devolo Mix Version)
"Bottle Pop" (Devolo Mix Version) — 3:31

Digital download (3-track)
"Bottle Pop" (Album Version) — 3:30
"Bottle Pop" (Video Version) — 3:00
"Bottle Pop" (Dave Audé Club Mix) — 8:31

Digital download (Remixes)
"Bottle Pop" (Dave Audé Radio Mix) — 3:41
"Bottle Pop" (Moto Blanco Radio Mix) — 3:07
"Bottle Pop" (Moto Blanco Club Mix) — 6:51
"Bottle Pop" (Moto Blanco Dub Mix)  —6:38
"Bottle Pop" (Digital Dog Extended Mix) — 4:03
"Bottle Pop" (Digital Dog Radio Mix) — 3:01
"Bottle Pop" (Digital Dog Extended Mix II) — 4:03
"Bottle Pop" (Digital Dog Radio Mix II) — 3:01

 Credits and personnel 
Credits adapted from the liner notes of Doll Domination''.

Recording
Recorded at Chalice Studio B (Los Angeles, California); The Record Plant (Hollywood, California); Irvine Spot (Irvine, California)
Mixed at Canaan Road Studios (New York City)

Personnel

Clubba Langg – co-producer
Fernando Garibay – songwriter, producer, instrumentation, programming
Mike Hogue – assistant recording
Chris Kasych – assistant recording
Kennard Garrett – keyboards
Sean "The Pen" Garrett – songwriter, producer, instrumentation, programming
Tony Maserati – mixer
Raymond "Rayza" Oglesby – keyboards, additional drum programming
Nicole Scherzinger – songwriter
Brian Schunck – assistant recording
Miles Walker – recording
Matt Wheeler – recording (Snoop Dogg's vocals)

Charts

Weekly charts

Year-end charts

Release history

See also 
List of number-one dance singles of 2009 (U.S.)

References 

2008 songs
2009 singles
Interscope Records singles
The Pussycat Dolls songs
Snoop Dogg songs
Songs written by Sean Garrett
Songs written by Fernando Garibay
Songs written by Nicole Scherzinger
Song recordings produced by Fernando Garibay